Aldermanite is a rare hydrated phosphate mineral with formula Mg5Al12(PO4)8(OH)22·32H2O. It is named after Arthur Richard Alderman (1901–1980), Professor of Geology and Mineralogy, University of Adelaide. Its type locality is Moculta Phosphate Quarry (Klemm's Quarry), Angaston, Barossa Valley, North Mount Lofty Ranges, Mount Lofty Ranges, South Australia, Australia.

References

Phosphate minerals
Aluminium minerals
Magnesium minerals
Orthorhombic minerals